Lilong (Thoubal) is a town with Municipal Council in Thoubal District in the Indian state of Manipur.

Demographics
 India census, Lilong (Thoubal) had a population of 20,267. Males constitute 50% of the population and females 50%. Lilong (Thoubal) has an average literacy rate of 58%, lower than the national average of 59.5%: male literacy is 69%, and female literacy is 47%. In Lilong (Thoubal), 22% of the population is under 6 years of age. The majority of the population is Muslim.

Vegetations  
Lilong has been popular for major vegetables production like mustard, cauliflower, potato, etc. Rice is the main cultivating plant in the field.The Ngangou Loukon is one of the seven lake in Manipur and most of the cultivation is also coming from this field. As other part of Manipur, Monsoon plays a main role in cultivation.

Politics 
Lilong is part of Inner Manipur (Lok Sabha constituency).

References

Cities and towns in Thoubal district
Thoubal